Montgomeryshire is a constituency of the Senedd. It elects one Member of the Senedd by the first past the post method of election. Also, however, it is one of eight constituencies in the Mid and West Wales electoral region, which elects four additional members, in addition to eight constituency members, to produce a degree of proportional representation for the region as a whole.

Boundaries

1999 to 2007 
The constituency was created for the first election to the Assembly, in 1999, with the name and boundaries of the Montgomeryshire Westminster constituency. 
It is entirely within the preserved county of Powys, and one of three Powys constituencies. 
Also, it is one of eight constituencies in the Mid and West Wales electoral region.

The other Powys constituencies are Brecon and Radnorshire and Clwyd South. 
Brecon and Radnorshire is also entirely within the preserved county of Powys, and within the Mid and West Wales region. 
Clwyd South is partly, and mostly, a Clwyd constituency, and within the North Wales electoral region.

The region consists of the eight constituencies of Brecon and Radnorshire, Carmarthen East and Dinefwr, Carmarthen West and South Pembrokeshire, Ceredigion, Llanelli, Meirionnydd Nant Conwy, Montgomeryshire and Preseli Pembrokeshire.

From 2007 
Constituency and regional boundaries changed for the 2007 Assembly election. Montgomeryshire remained a Powys constituency, however, and one of eight constituencies in the Mid and West Wales electoral region.

Montgomeryshire is one of two constituencies covering Powys, both entirely within the preserved county, and both within the Mid and West Wales region. 
The other Powys constituency is Brecon and Radnorshire.

The Mid and West Wales region consists of the constituencies of Brecon and Radnorshire, Carmarthen East and Dinefwr, Carmarthen West and South Pembrokeshire, Ceredigion, Dwyfor Meirionnydd, Llanelli, Montgomeryshire and Preseli Pembrokeshire.

For Westminster purposes, the same new constituency boundaries became effective for the 2010 United Kingdom general election.

Voting 
In general elections for the Senedd, each voter has two votes. The first vote may be used to vote for a candidate to become the Member of the Senedd for the voter's constituency, elected by the first past the post system. The second vote may be used to vote for a regional closed party list of candidates. Additional member seats are allocated from the lists by the d'Hondt method, with constituency results being taken into account in the allocation.

Assembly members and Members of the Senedd

Elections

Elections in the 2020s

Elections in the 2010s 

Regional ballots rejected: 270

Elections in the 2000s 

2003 Electorate: 45,598
Regional ballots rejected: 250

Elections in the 1990s

References 

Montgomeryshire
Senedd constituencies in the Mid and West Wales electoral region
1999 establishments in Wales
Constituencies established in 1999
Politics of Powys